Bob or Bobby Bell may refer to:

Sports
Bob Bell (motorsport) (born 1958), British Formula One technical director
Bob Bell (American football) (born 1948), American football player
Bobby Bell (born 1940), American football player
Bobby Bell (English footballer) (born 1950), English footballer
Bobby Bell (Scottish footballer) (1934–2007), Scottish footballer
Bob Bell (Australian footballer) (1953–2010), Australian rules footballer

Others
Bob Bell (actor) (1922–1997), American actor
Bob Bell (art director) (1918–2009), British art director
Bob Bell (insurance), British insurance magnate, campaigner of the Maxi yachts Condor and Condor of Bermuda in the 1970s & 80s
Bob Bell (politician) (1929–2011), New Zealand politician
Bob Bell (sculptor), Choctaw sculptor and "Master Artist" of the Five Civilized Tribes Museum

See also
Rob Bell (born 1970), Christian author
Robert Bell (disambiguation)